The Kalob Griffin Band (The KGB) 
is a Philadelphia based five-piece Americana rock band formed in 2009,  most commonly known for their impromptu shows and the allegiance of their community driven fanbase.

History
The Kalob Griffin Band began when frontman, Kalob Griffin, met current lead guitarist/mandolin/banjoist Rob Dwyer at a house party the two attended at Pennsylvania State University in 2009. The two linked with other college friends, and went on to perform to packed venues all over State College, PA. The success inspired Griffin and Dwyer to continue a full-time career as musicians post college, and after many band transformations, the "KGB" secured its lineup in 2011. The current folk rock quintet includes: Eric Lawry on drums/backup vocals, John Hildenbrand on keys/backup vocals, and Jonathan Colvson on electric bass.

Their early success started with several local shows, including a live session on a classic rock show on Penn State’s student-run radio station, WKPS. The band landed a weekly gig at State College’s Café 210 West, opened for Matt Pond PA, embarked on two national tours as the supporting band for emerging British singer/songwriter Bobby Long (ATO Records), and released a self-titled EP. The band has been touring as their own outfit since 2012.

Musical career
They released their first full length, "June Found a Gun" in 2012, which was followed by a tour in support of the album. They have released tracks from their forthcoming EP, "Full Love," mixed by Bill Morarity (Dr. Dog, Man Man) and mastered by Greg Calbi (Alabama Shakes, Bruce Springsteen) of Sterling Sound.

The Kalob Griffin Band has played to crowds of thousands, including at WXPN Music Festival in Philadelphia, Pennsylvania and the Mile High Music Festival in Denver, Colorado. The band has had radio airplay across the country––playing over 150 shows, including major festival appearances and gigs along the east coast. The lyrical style is similar to that of old-fashioned and generational narratives of Neil Young and Bruce Springsteen. The Kalob Griffin Band has been compared to contemporary artists such as Deer Tick (band) and Whiskeytown. The band has had profile features in the Herald-Sun and Fly Magazine.

Festival appearances include WXPN Music Festival, Mile High Music Festival, Musikfest, Susquehanna Breakdown and the Dewey Beach, Delaware Music Conference.

In 2011, the Kalob Griffin Band was nominated for The Deli Magazine Philadelphia "Emerging Acts of 2011" and WSTW "Best EP Homey" Award and "Best Song Homey" Award.  Within the first couple of months of 2012, they were awarded the Tri-State Indie "Best Philadelphia Artist" Award.

The KGB Family
Often during shows, fans are heard chanting "KGB, KGB", a mantra attached to the "KGB Family". The band credits its early success to the devotion of family, friends, and fans who packed venues and followed the band through their numerous tours. This allegiance swiftly moved their success into the Philadelphia music scene, and the band continues to operate as a large family dynamic, honoring its roots.

Members
 Kalob Griffin - lead vocals, guitar
 Eric Lawry - drums, vocals
 Rob Dwyer - lead guitar, mandolin, banjo
 Jonathan Colvosn - upright and electric bass
 John Hildenbrand- keys, backup vocals

Discography

EPs
 Kalob Griffin Band (2011)
 "Full Love" (2014)

Albums
 "June Found a Gun" (2012)

References 

 http://thekey.xpn.org/2013/12/20/the-kalob-griffin-band-will-bring-new-tunes-and-holiday-vibes-to-world-cafe-live-tomorrow/
 http://www.tristateindie.com/johnny-brendas-104-the-kalob-griffin-band-driftwood-chelsea-mitchell/
 http://philadelphia.thedelimagazine.com/9214/sway-kalob-griffin-band-and-their-country-dusted-rock-milkboy-philly-mar-31
 http://thekey.xpn.org/2012/12/19/kalob-griffin-band-lives-while-theyre-young-playing-world-cafe-live-1222/
 http://convozine.com/music/31375
 http://1146miles.com/music/kalob-griffin-band-full-love/

External links
 Official Website
 Facebook
 Twitter

American alternative country groups
Musical groups established in 2009